Tudor Crisps was a brand of potato crisps produced in Sandyford, Newcastle upon Tyne, England. Originally an independent firm, established in Newcastle in 1947, Tudor later moved to Peterlee to a new factory, which still exists but was closed in 2017. Tudor was acquired by Smiths Crisps in 1961, and Smiths’ new Salt & Vinegar flavour would first be tested by Tudor in their home market of north-east England before it was launched nationally by Smiths in 1967.

The 1970s television advertisements featured a paper boy, bribed with a ‘canny bag of crisps’ to brave delivering his papers to a tall tower block (in reality Derwent Tower, Dunston, Tyne and Wear). In the 1980s, the ads gave cult status to their star, Allen Mechen, who played the adult paperboy who returned as an apparently successful and wealthy man, driving a Rolls-Royce car and eating a bag of Tudor Crisps. The twist in the tale was when he donned a chauffeur's cap in the finale.

Smiths Tudor was later bought by Nabisco, which also owned Walkers Crisps and later became part of the Walkers division of PepsiCo. The Tudor Crisps brand was discontinued in 2003, when Walkers decided to focus on its core crisp range. The Smiths brand was also mostly phased out around the same time as Tudor, although some products such as Scampi Fries and Frazzles are still sold under the Smiths brand.

Tudor salt and vinegar flavour crisps were sold in blue packaging and cheese and onion in green bags, like most other brands in the UK, but the move to Walkers crisps reversed the colours.

References

British snack foods
Companies based in Newcastle upon Tyne
Peterlee